Kathleen Gibson (born Kitty Stride, 1915-1974) was a British actress who developed her craft in repertory theatre. In 1932, Gibson played one of the friends of the character D'Recamier (Pearl Argyle) in the Frederick Ashton ballet "Magic Nights".

Gibson was discovered by C. B. Cochran, who made her one of Cochran's Young Ladies. On 30 November 1933, she played Ena Hawkins in a production of Mr. Whittington at the Alhambra Theatre, Glasgow, starring alongside Jack Buchanan. A review published in The Stage in December 1933 said that Gibson "looks pretty in the part of Ena and performs some very neat dancing". The show went on tour and included some weeks at the London Hippodrome Theatre. This led to a film contract.

Gibson died in Paddington, London in 1974.

Filmography
Mr Stringfellow Says No (1934)
 Born That Way (1936)
The Last Rose of Summer (1937)
The Heirloom Mystery (1937)
Cross My Heart (1937)
Bells of St. Mary's (1937)
Remember When (1937)
The High Command (1937)
Riding High (1937)
The Good Old Days (1940)

References

 Film Star who's Who on the Screen 1938.

External links

1915 births
British film actresses
British stage actresses
1974 deaths